Originally produced by Minolta, and currently produced by Sony, the 28mm f/2.8 is compatible with cameras using the Minolta AF and Sony α lens mounts.

See also
 List of Minolta A-mount lenses

Sources
Dyxum lens data

External links
Sony:  SAL-28F28: 28mm F2.8 Fixed lens

28
Camera lenses introduced in 2006